Morrocoy National Park is located in the easternmost coast of Falcón state and northwestern of Golfo Triste, in the west central Venezuelan coast, near the towns of Boca de Aroa, Tucacas, Sanare, Chichiriviche, Flamenco and Tocuyo de la Costa, and consists of . It was declared a national park on May 26, 1974 by Executive Order No. 113, Official Gazette No. 30408 on May 27, 1974.

Overview

The park extends across both terrestrial and aquatic areas of Golfo Triste. It contains an area of mangroves and numerous islets or cays among which are Borracho, Muerto, Sombrero, Sal, Las Animas and Peraza, among others. There are spectacular white sand beaches on these cays; Mero, Paiclas, los Juanes, Playuela, Tucupido, Azul, Boca Seca and many more. The park's internal bays and mangroves, cays and islands sit in the relief of Chichiriviche hills, with elevations of 250 m.

The Declaration as a National Park or Protected Area means the following:

Do not allow the alteration of each of the ecosystems that make up the Morrocoy National Park, such as: coral reefs and seagrass beds, keys, bass, halophytic, mangroves and coastal lagoons, savannas and deciduous forests. Thus conserving biodiversity and ecological balance of the park.
Ensure natural migrations of animal species.
Recovery of areas and ecosystems that have been impacted by man and ensure that these and all others remain in excellent conditions.
Encourage and provide the best conditions to promote scientific research and environmental education.
Create and promote activities that promote tourism and recreation, as long as it keep the conservation of the entire ecosystem of Morrocoy National Park.
Preserve all historic sites, and archeological spelunking in the park.

Access

From Caracas, take the Central Regional Highway to past the dealer Guacara (approximately 140 km). Variant is taken by highway via Yagua to Puerto Cabello. Arriving at El Palito take the highway to Puerto Cabello in Morón address. In the Morón dealer takes the highway Morón-Tucacas and after traveling 40 km it reach the entrance to the Morrocoy National Park.

Fauna

The park is inhabited by numerous species of birds, about 266, as report by Cuare Wildlife Refuge. Because Morrocoy National Park and Wildlife Refuge Cuare are located in the same geographic area, it is inferred that the park should have a similar number. Some notable species are: the osprey; vulnerable species such as flamingo, palette heron, pelican; species of birds whose preferred habitat is the mangrove nesting and resting such as, Neotropic, Chusmita or white Garcita, the helmeted cockaded, the  amazona real parrot, the red scarlet ibis, pechiblanca heron (tricolored heron); and species with restricted distribution such as the frigatebird or earwig. Tues mangroves of Morrocoy Bay are excellent bird sanctuaries, especially on the island of Pájaros located in the central area of the park, which is covered with mangrove cay.

There are also many other types of animals living in the park. Marine reptiles include the various turtle species such as the green sea turtle, the hawksbill turtle, cardon turtle, horned turtle as well as the coastal alligator, all considered by the red book as endangered. Among mammals are both marine mammals (dolphins, whales) that use the park as a refuge and the different species of land mammals which are located mainly in the Chichiriviche Hill, among which are the brocket deer and caramerudo deer, the anteater, the crab-eating fox, howler monkey, sloth, opossum, paca, agouti and peccary cinched. Fish breeding in the park are grouper, snapper, corvina, tarpon, snook, toadfish, school shark, sardines, mackerel, grunt, the barracuda, black pacu and various fish that inhabit the coral reefs . Shellfish species are the mangrove oyster, sea hares, quigua, 2 types of lobsters (Panulirus argus, Panulirus grettatus), blue and red crabs, and other species. There is also a diverse range of insects, although there is still information being gathered for the area.

The park's wildlife has suffered a major negative impact due to indiscriminate activities done by man, there has been a significant decline in coral species, which have been declining in recent years.

Flora
The flora corresponds to the area of tropical dry forest. The vegetation is quite varied and is closely associated with geomorphological positions, the most important subsets being: coast, coastal lagoons, marshes, saline shoals, keys, and shallow seabed. It ranges from evergreen plants, such as olives, to deciduous plants like naked Indian. Plants are adapted to high salinity soils as in the case of glass grass. Continuing toward the east slope of the Chichiriviche hill towards Mayorquina, xerophytic vegetation of the cactus family can be seen. Red mangrove, black mangrove, white mangrove, buttonwood mangrove, mangrove vegetation are the dominant vegetation and landscape of the National Park, and form a unit that preserves ecologically fragile balance of the coastline, in an area of approximately 4,500 ha. Among the underwater marine growth, a wide variety of algae, including seagrass, which is one of the favorite foods of the green turtle.

Climate
The warm tropical climate is influenced by the northeast trade winds, with low rates of precipitation. Temperature is relatively uniform throughout the year between 27 and 35 °C. In cold weather it can reach temperatures between 23-26 °C. The rainiest period extends from August to December, particularly in November and December.

Tourist activities

Morrocoy National Park has a wide range of potential environmental and landscapes, coupled with extraordinary landscape scenarios that characterize each of the places that make up the park, rich in biodiversity and beauty.

Morrocoy beaches are spectacular and numerous: Sombrero cay, Playuela, Playuelita, Alemán cay, Mayorquina, Pescadores cay, Mero beach, Punta Brava, Boca Paiclás, Boca Seca, los Juanes, Bajo Caimán, Tucupido, Sal cay, borracho cay etc. Beneath the beaches corals and fish offer their best to divers.

At 285m high, Chichiriviche Hill is the highest point in the park. It stands in high relief amid the surrounding coastal environment, of Tertiary-period coral origin, belonging to the geological formation called Capadare - Agua Linda. The Chichiriviche Hill, is the landscape less associated with coastal and marine nature that characterizes the Morrocoy National Park.

Within the Morrocoy National Park bulk flow of tourists from all over the national territory, who will enjoy the variety of beaches, some come to camp and others come with their boats. As a national park, is under the supervision of INPARQUES (National Parks Institute) who maintains order and control.

Within the park are various communities, towns, businesses, and inns. Towns are Caño Leon, Morrocoy, Lizardo and Aguasalobre. Some inns for tourists are Posada La Esmeralda, Paraíso Azul, Las Trinitarias, El Solar de la Luna, etc...

There are also small marinas that make up the Association of Marine Sports of Golfo Triste, which is made up: Marina El Ancla, Marina Las Canoas, Marina Puerto del Medio, Marina Indunave, Marina Costa Azul, Marina Embarcadero Morrocoy, Marina Caribe, Marina La Cazanga and Marina La Cuevita.

The piers house associations of boatmen who are dedicated to the transport of tourists to the various beaches of Morrocoy. Las Luisas, Morrocoy and Aguasalobre are the piers in the area.

Also small stalls of cocadas, empanadas, coconut water and local crafts can be found.

Los Juanes
Los Juanes belongs to Morrocoy National Park. It is also known as "La Piscina" (The Pool) because it is not sand beach, so the only access is the sea, a natural low where vacationers are able to enjoy its warm blue waters, always in time to the music bearing get the yachts moored in the shelter. It has a lot of vendors selling among other things, sea delicacies and cuisine accompanied by deep blue waters, lobster, ceviches, seafood, barbecue, drinks and even desserts. These are part of the services that can be found in Los Juanes and in some cases have outlets. There are some ice cream vendors to enjoy a nice dessert after a delicious seafood meal.

Visiting Los Juanes may be done via a private boat or a small fishing boat, which will come to an area surrounded by mangroves where boats are anchored to enjoy of the sea. These boats can be taken from the same Morrocoy park or piers of Tucacas town.

Los Juanes has two islands ideal for snorkeling due to their underwater fauna living among corals of various colors, mangroves and  shallow waters. They have become probably the most original and popular sites of all Morrocoy National Park.

References

External links 

National parks of Venezuela
Tourist attractions in Falcón
Protected areas established in 1974
1974 establishments in Venezuela
Geography of Falcón
Reefs of Venezuela